Illegal stamps are postage stamp–like labels issued in the names of existing independent countries or territories used to defraud postal administrations, stamp collectors, and the general public. Often, but not always, a member nation of the Universal Postal Union (UPU) will have asked the UPU to issue an "International Bureau Circular" advising others of the illegal stamps. According to the UPU, the market is estimated to be at least $500 million per year.

Illegal stamps are to be distinguished from the many varieties of cinderella stamps which may have some of the same characteristics as illegal stamps but which are not usually issued in the name of an existing country, and from postal forgeries, the illegal counterfeiting of actual stamps.

Identifying illegal stamps
There is no definitive method to identifying illegal stamp issues.
 Many illegal stamps are issued in the names of countries or territories from Africa or the former Soviet Union, or smaller island nations from around the world. Older illegal issues (from the 1970s) were often in the names of Arab states.
 Most illegal stamps are not listed in the major stamp catalogues, though some may have been included in error or because their status is unclear or because the criteria for entry differ from those used by the UPU to recognise valid stamp issues.
 The WADP Numbering System (WNS), developed by the World Association for the Development of Philately and the UPU, catalogues stamps issued by UPU member nations since 2002. Not all UPU members participate.

Consequences of illegal postage issues
Illegal stamps are said to result in adverse consequences for several different parties. Stamp collectors may lose money by mistakenly buying illegal stamps that have little or no monetary value. In addition, inexperienced or non-philatelists have been tricked into buying illegal stamps that are worthless memorabilia for their favorite hobby or interests. Additionally, legitimate stamp dealers may see their market, and the reputation of their industry, eroded by the illegal issues market.

See also
Society for the Suppression of Speculative Stamps

References

Further reading
 Figueiredo, Albertino de. Illegal and Abusive Stamp Issues: A lecture. Madrid: The Albertino de Figueiredo foundation for philately, 2003 7p.
 Melville, Frederick J. Phantom Philately. London: Philatelic Institute, 1923 204p.
 Pope, Mavis. Selected Forgeries, Bogus Issues, Fakes and Other Philatelically Related Items Intended to Defraud, Misrepresent or Imitate: A Monograph to Alert Potential Philatelists to Such Material and to Provide Some Means of Identification. Birmingham Gardens, N.S.W.: the author, 1991 105p.

External links

 AskPhil.org List of UPU illegal stamp alerts
 AskPhil.org List of issues believed by collectors to be Illegal
 AskPhil labels of Topics/Thematics listed as bogus, unauthorized, not valid for postal use
 UPU illegal stamp circulars link page 
 UPU 1996-2003 circulars in pdf
http://www.pwmo.org/Illegals/18-UPU-Interview-EN.htm An interview with the Program Manager "Philately and IRC" at the International Bureau of the UPU

Universal Postal Union
Philatelic terminology